"Rock Yo Hips" is a song by American Southern hip hop sextet Crime Mob featuring Lil Scrappy. It was recorded at PatchWerk Recording Studios in Atlanta and released on August 29, 2006 via Crunk Incorporated/Reprise Records as the lead single from the group's second studio album Hated on Mostly. Production was handled by Crime Mob member Lil' Jay. The single peaked at number 30 on the US Billboard Hot 100.

The music video directed by Dr. Teeth premiered on BET.com on November 7, 2006. The style of the video is inspired by Historically black colleges and universities, such as Morehouse College and Spelman College, and featured African-American fraternities such as Phi Beta Sigma, Omega Psi Phi, Alpha Phi Alpha and Kappa Alpha Psi.

The official remix features fellow rappers Young Dro and Rasheeda and new verses from the group.

Track listing

Personnel
Jonathan "Lil' Jay" Lewis – main artist, songwriter, producer, mixing
Brittany "Diamond" Carpentero – main artist, songwriter
Venetia "Princess" Lewis – main artist, songwriter
Jarques "M.I.G." Usher – main artist, songwriter
Chris "Killa C" Henderson – main artist, songwriter
Alphonce "Cyco Black" Smith – main artist, songwriter
Darryl "Lil Scrappy" Richardson – featured artist
Mike Wilson – mixing, recording
Jamie Newman – assistant mixing

Charts

Weekly charts

Year-end charts

References

External links

2006 songs
Crunk songs
2006 singles
Crime Mob songs
Lil Scrappy songs
Warner Records singles